Paul Petit may refer to:

Paul Petit (aviator) (1890–1918), World War I flying ace 
Paul Petit (writer) (1893–1944), French writer, sociologist, diplomat and French Resistance worker
Paul Petit (historian) (1914–1981), French scholar of Roman history

See also
Paul Petiet (1770–1849), French adjutant-general during the Napoleonic Wars
Paul Pettit (1931–2020), Major League Baseball pitcher
Paul Pettitt, British archaeologist